Leonard P. Crary was a member of the Wisconsin State Assembly during the 1848 and 1850 sessions. He originally represented a Milwaukee County, Wisconsin district and later Winnebago County, Wisconsin. Other positions he held include serving as a Milwaukee, Wisconsin alderman. Crary was a Democrat.

References

People from Winnebago County, Wisconsin
Milwaukee Common Council members
Year of birth missing
Year of death missing
Democratic Party members of the Wisconsin State Assembly